Treaty of Hartford can refer to any of three treaties signed in Hartford, Connecticut:

Treaty of Hartford (1638), divided Pequot territory after their defeat in the Pequot War
Treaty of Hartford (1650), fixed border between New Netherlands and the English colonies in North America
Treaty of Hartford (1786), fixed border between New York and Massachusetts